Templeton Township is one of eleven townships in Atchison County, Missouri, United States. As of the 2010 census, its population was 79.

Templeton Township was established in 1870, and named after John W. Templeton, a county official.

Geography

Nishnabotna Lake is within this township.

Transportation
Templeton Township contains one airport, Rock Port Municipal Airport.

References

 USGS Geographic Names Information System (GNIS)

External links
 US-Counties.com
 City-Data.com

Townships in Atchison County, Missouri
Townships in Missouri